Patrick Bou Abboud (born July 24, 1987) is a professional Lebanese basketball player for Sagesse SC in the Lebanese Basketball League. He previously played with Hekmeh BC, Homenetmen Beirut BC, Champville SC, Antranik SC, Bejjeh SC, and Tadamon Zouk.

LBL career statistics

Regular season

|-
| style="text-align:left;"|2019-2020
| style="text-align:left;"|Beirut First Club BC
| 4||4||27.3||41.7||43.8||66.7||5.0||8.3||1.55||1.75||8.3
|-
| style="text-align:left;"|2018-2019
| style="text-align:left;"|Homentmen Beirut
| 23||23||NA||48.5||38.7||91.7||6.4||1.5||NA||NA||8.5
|-
| style="text-align:left;"|2017-2018
| style="text-align:left;"|Antonine Club
| 26||26||28||41.5||30.4||72.9||6.22||2.14||1.22||0.59||11.8
|-
| style="text-align:left;"|2016-2017
| style="text-align:left;"|Sagesse Club
| 27||27||NA||40.1||21.3||73.9||5.3||1.5|| NA||NA||6.3 
|-
| style="text-align:left;"|2011-2012
| style="text-align:left;"|Bejjeh Club
| 23||23||32||40.3||27.8||71.9||7.6||2.3||1.6||1.0||11.9
|-
| style="text-align:left;"|2009-2010
| style="text-align:left;"|Sagesse Club
| NA||NA||NA||47.2||30.0||63.2||3.7||NA||1.0||NA||6.7
|-
| style="text-align:left;"|2008-2009
| style="text-align:left;"|Antranik Club
| 22||22||NA||38.0||31.3||82.9||6.3||1.8||1.1||NA||9.7
|-
| style="text-align:left;"|2007-2008
| style="text-align:left;"|Antranik Club
| 12||12||NA||48.6||16.7||62.5||5.2||1.8||1.6||NA||7.1
|-
|}

Playoffs

References
https://basketball.asia-basket.com/player/Patrick-Bou-Abboud/267575

1987 births
Living people
Lebanese men's basketball players
Small forwards
Power forwards (basketball)
Sportspeople from Beirut
Sagesse SC basketball players